Sergio Fabián Pezzotta (born 28 November 1967 in Rosario, Santa Fe) is an Argentine football referee.

He has been a referee in domestic Primera División since 1999 and an International FIFA referee since 2000.

After the retirement of fellow countryman Horacio Elizondo he became Argentine's top referee and was selected for the 2007 Copa América where he took charge of three games (Brazil vs Mexico, Brazil vs Ecuador; both group stage and the quarterfinal between Mexico and Paraguay).

Injury kept him out from the preliminary tests for 2010 FIFA World Cup where Héctor Baldassi had been chosen instead to represent Argentine FA.

Pezzotta returned to full fitness in 2011 and was selected for his second Copa America; held in home his country.

Earlier in 2011 he took charge of the second leg of the Copa Libertadores final where Santos defeated Peñarol to claim the trophy.

External links 
 World Referee.com - Sergio Pezzotta

1967 births
Living people
Argentine football referees
Copa América referees
Sportspeople from Rosario, Santa Fe